Barneville-la-Bertran is a commune in the Calvados department in the Normandy region of north-western France.

The inhabitants of the commune are known as Barnevillais or Barnevillaises.

Geography
Barneville-la-Bertran is located north of the Pays d'Auge some 6 km south-west of Honfleur, 15 km south by south-east of Le Havre (across the Seine Estuary) and 10 km north-east of Deauville. Access to the commune is by the D62 from Pennedepie in the north which passes through the north of the commune and continues east to Équemauville. The D279 branches from the D288 south of the commune - just east of Deauville – Normandie Airport - and passes north through the village and joins the D62 just east of the commune. The commune is mostly farmland.

Toponymy
Barneville was called Barnavilla in 1062: from the Scandinavian antroponym Biarn or Barni and the Latin villa giving the meaning "rural domain". Bertran is the family name of the lords of the area in the Middle Ages.

On 6 November 1995 the commune of Barneville officially changed its name to Barneville-la-Bertran.

History
Barneville-la-Bertran appears as Barneville-la-Bertrand on the 1750 Cassini Map and as Barneville on the 1790 version.

Administration

List of Successive Mayors

The municipal council is made up of 11 members including the Mayor and two deputies.

Demography
In 2017 the commune had 127 inhabitants.

Culture and heritage

Civil heritage
The commune has two buildings and sites that are registered as historical monuments:

The Manoir des Vallées (12th century)
The Chateau of Barneville Park (1873)

Religious heritage

The Church of Saint John the Baptist is flanked by a quadrangular tower and is registered as an historical monument.

Notable people linked to the commune

 Jean Doublet (1655 - 1728 at Barneville), pirate.
 Marie-Catherine d'Aulnoy (1651 at Barneville - 1705), French writer of fairy tales.
 Françoise Sagan (1935-2004), writer, lived in the Breuil Manor before Lucien and Sacha Guitry. Died in hospital at Équemauville on 24 September 2004. Her body remained in her manor before being buried in Lot where she was born.

See also
Communes of the Calvados department

References

Communes of Calvados (department)